The Rev. Andrew Morrissey, C.S.C. (November 16, 1860 – May 27, 1921) was an Irish-American priest and President of the University of Notre Dame from 1893 to 1905, after having served previously as director of studies. He was born in 1860 in Ireland, and left for America at the age of twelve. He studied in the United States and was professed with the Congregation of Holy Cross in 1880. He taught at Sacred Heart College, Watertown, Wisconsin, and was ordained priest in 1884. Morrissey Hall at the University of Notre Dame was dedicated in his honor.

President of the University of Notre Dame
In 1885 he arrived at Notre Dame, where he served as Director of Studies. In 1892, he succeeded Fr. John Augustine Zahm as Vice President, and in 1893, when Fr. Thomas E. Walsh died. On his deathbed in 1893, Walsh requested that Morrissey succeed him as president. Fr. Edward Sorin died on October 31 of 1893, making Fr. Morrissey the first Notre Dame president to serve without the university founder. His presidency saw the construction of the Grotto in 1896, the addition of wings to Sorin Hall in 1897 and the erection of the first gymnasium in 1898. In 1900 student enrollment increased to more than 700, with most students still followed the Commercial Course.
During Morrissey's 12-year tenure, the University remained largely focused on younger students in its boarding school model, in line with the vision of Fr. Sorin. Many college students did not graduate, and enrolled just to study the Commerce courses. Morrissey once said, "We can never compete with those colleges that have such tremendous endowments! Our very existence depends on giving Catholic boys a good preparatory foundation." His vision was opposed by Fr. John Zahm, who championed the view of Notre Dame becoming a research university dedicated to scholarship. Morrissey and Zahm were very different men, and often at odds. Zahm was cold, stand-offish, guileless, while Morrissey was warm-hearted, expansive, not altogether impartial. Zahm was willing to go into debt in order to expand the University, while debt was strongly opposed by Morrissey. Zahm was deeply intellectual but no politician; Morrissey, on the other hand, was rather astute.

References

External sources

External links

Presidents of the University of Notre Dame
20th-century American Roman Catholic priests
Congregation of Holy Cross
1860 births
1921 deaths